Susan Ackerman may refer to:

 Susan Ackerman (biblical scholar) (born 1958), American biblical scholar
 Susan Ackerman (neuroscientist)
 Susan Rose-Ackerman